Luciano Buonaparte may refer to:

 Luciano Buonaparte (priest) (1718–1791), archdeacon of the Cathedral of the Diocese of Ajaccio in 1771 and Canon of the Cathedral of the Diocese of Ajaccio
 Lucien Bonaparte (1775–1840), Prince Français, 1st Prince of Canino and Musignano